Ilmi Parkkari (1926–1979) was a Finnish film and stage actress.


Selected filmography
 Gabriel, Come Back (1951)
 The Girl from Moon Bridge (1953)

References

Bibliography 
 Gröndahl, Laura. Experiences in Theatrical Spaces: Five Scenographies of Miss Julie. University of Art and Design Helsinki, 2004.

External links 
 

1926 births
1979 deaths
People from Vyborg District
Finnish stage actresses
Finnish film actresses
Finnish television actresses